The Bosnia-Hercegovina Service Medal It was founded on 30 August 1909, in memory of the annexation of Bosnia and Herzegovina to the Austro-Hungarian Monarchy in 1908. Bosnia and Herzegovina itself has been occupied by the Austria-Hungary since 1878. It remained part of the Ottoman Empire until 1908, when it was merged, annexed to the empire. The exact number of awards is uncertain because it was received not only by soldiers but also by officials. The number is approximately 2800.

The medal is minted in bronze. On the obverse there is a portrait of Emperor Franz Joseph I, with the Latin inscription FRANC · IOS · I · D · G · IMP · AVSTR · REX BOH · ETC · ET AP · REX HVNG. On reverse, on a stylized laurel tree, rests the coat of arms of Bosnia and Herzegovina with a lily crown. In the crown of the tree there is a thin strip on each side with the inscription DIE V · OCT · MCMVIII, and on the trunk of the tree on an oblique ribbon IN · MEMORIAM.

Endnotes

Orders, decorations, and medals of Austria-Hungary
Awards established in 1909